The College Conference of Illinois and Wisconsin men's basketball tournament is the annual conference basketball championship tournament for the NCAA Division III College Conference of Illinois and Wisconsin. The tournament has been held annually since 2006. It is a single-elimination tournament and seeding is based on regular conference season records.

The winner, declared conference champion, receives the CCIW's automatic bid to the NCAA Men's Division III Basketball Championship.

Results

Championship records

Carroll and Millikin have not yet qualified for the CCIW tournament finals.

References

NCAA Division III men's basketball conference tournaments

Recurring sporting events established in 2006